A Postalveolar fricative is a fricative consonant produced with a postalveolar place of articulation. Postalveolar fricative may refer to:

 The voiced postalveolar fricative, IPA: 
 The voiced postalveolar non-sibilant fricative, IPA: 
 The voiced retroflex fricative, IPA: 
 The voiced alveolo-palatal fricative, IPA: 
 The voiceless postalveolar fricative, IPA: 
 The voiceless postalveolar non-sibilant fricative, IPA: 
 The voiceless retroflex fricative, IPA: 
 The voiceless alveolo-palatal fricative